In number theory, a probable prime (PRP) is an integer that satisfies a specific condition that is satisfied by all prime numbers, but which is not satisfied by most composite numbers. Different types of probable primes have different specific conditions. While there may be probable primes that are composite (called pseudoprimes), the condition is generally chosen in order to make such exceptions rare.

Calculate . If the result is not 1, then n is composite. If the result is 1, then n is likely to be prime; n is then called a probable prime to base a. A weak probable prime to base a is an integer that is a probable prime to base a, but which is not a strong probable prime to base a (see below).

For a fixed base a, it is unusual for a composite number to be a probable prime (that is, a pseudoprime) to that base. The number of odd primes in the same interval is 1,091,987,404.

Properties
Probable primality is a basis for efficient primality testing algorithms, which find application in cryptography. These algorithms are usually probabilistic in nature. The idea is that while there are composite probable primes to base a for any fixed a, we may hope there exists some fixed P<1 such that for any given composite n, if we choose a at random, then the probability that n is pseudoprime to base a is at most P.  If we repeat this test k times, choosing a new a each time, the probability of n being pseudoprime to all the as tested is hence at most Pk, and as this decreases exponentially, only moderate k is required to make this probability negligibly small (compared to, for example, the probability of computer hardware error).

This is unfortunately false for weak probable primes, because there exist Carmichael numbers; but it is true for more refined notions of probable primality, such as strong probable primes (P = 1/4, Miller–Rabin algorithm), or
Euler probable primes (P = 1/2, Solovay–Strassen algorithm).

Even when a deterministic primality proof is required, a useful first step is to test for probable primality. This can quickly eliminate (with certainty) most composites.

A PRP test is sometimes combined with a table of small pseudoprimes to quickly establish the primality of a given number smaller than some threshold.

Variations
An Euler probable prime to base a is an integer that is indicated prime by the somewhat stronger theorem that for any prime p, a(p−1)/2 equals  modulo p, where  is the Jacobi symbol. An Euler probable prime which is composite is called an Euler–Jacobi pseudoprime to base a.  The smallest Euler-Jacobi pseudoprime to base 2 is 561.  There are 11347 Euler-Jacobi pseudoprimes base 2 that are less than 25·109.

This test may be improved by using the fact that the only square roots of 1 modulo a prime are 1 and −1. Write n = d · 2s + 1, where d is odd. The number n is a strong probable prime (SPRP) to base a if:

 
or
 

A composite strong probable prime to base a is called a strong pseudoprime to base a. Every strong probable prime to base a is also an Euler probable prime to the same base, but not vice versa.

The smallest strong pseudoprime base 2 is 2047. There are 4842 strong pseudoprimes base 2 that are less than 25·109.

There are also Lucas probable primes, which are based on Lucas sequences.  A Lucas probable prime test can be used alone. The Baillie–PSW primality test combines a Lucas test with a strong probable prime test.

Example of SPRP
To test whether 97 is a strong probable prime base 2:
 Step 2: Choose , . We will choose .
 Step 3: Calculate , i.e. .
Otherwise,  is definitely composite
 
 
 
 
 Therefore,  is a strong probable prime base 2 (and is therefore a probable prime base 2).

See also
 Baillie–PSW primality test
 Euler–Jacobi pseudoprime
 Carmichael number
 Lucas pseudoprime
 Miller–Rabin primality test
 Provable prime

External links
 The prime glossary – Probable prime
 The PRP Top 10000 (the largest known probable primes)

References

Pseudoprimes